Cheshire County Cricket Club was established on 29 September 1908.  Though a previous incarnation of the club had played in the 1895 Minor Counties Championship, the club in its current form has since played minor counties cricket from 1909 and played List A cricket from 1964 to 2004, using a different number of home grounds during that time. Their first home minor counties fixture in 1895 was against Staffordshire at  Cale Green, Stockport, while their first List A match came 68 years later against Surrey in the 1964 Gillette Cup at the Ellerman Lines Cricket Ground, Hoylake.

The 35 grounds that Cheshire have used for home matches since 1895 are listed below, with statistics complete through to the end of the 2014 season.

Grounds

List A
Below is a complete list of grounds used by Cheshire County Cricket Club when it was permitted to play List A matches. These grounds have also held Minor Counties Championship and MCCA Knockout Trophy matches.

Minor Counties
Below is a complete list of grounds used by Cheshire County Cricket Club in Minor Counties Championship and MCCA Knockout Trophy matches.

Notes

References

Cheshire County Cricket Club
Cricket grounds in Cheshire
Cheshire